Laval was a former provincial electoral district in the province of Quebec, Canada. It was located in the Laval region north of Montreal, but for some of its history it also included parts of Montreal itself.

It was created for the 1867 election (and an electoral district of that name existed earlier in the Legislative Assembly of the Province of Canada).  Its final election was in 1976.  It disappeared in the 1981 election and its successor electoral districts were Fabre and Chomedey.

Members of the Legislative Assembly / National Assembly

 Joseph-Hyacinthe Bellerose, Conservative Party (1867–1875)
 Louis-Onésime Loranger, Conservative Party (1875–1882)
 Pierre-Évariste Leblanc, Conservative Party (1882–1883)
 Amédée Gaboury, Liberal (1883–1884)
 Pierre-Évariste Leblanc, Conservative Party (1884–1908)
 Joseph Wenceslas Levesque, Liberal (1908–1919)
 Joseph-Olivier Renaud, Conservative Party (1919–1931)
 Joseph Filion, Liberal (1931–1935)
 François-Joseph Leduc, Conservative Party – Union Nationale – Liberal (1935–1948)
 Omer Barrière, Union Nationale (1948–1956)
 Léopold Pouliot, Union Nationale (1956–1960)
 Jean-Noël Lavoie, Liberal (1960–1981)

External links
 Election results (National Assembly)
 Election results (QuebecPolitique.com)

Laval
Politics of Laval, Quebec